The 2000 European Athletics Indoor Championships were held from Friday, 25 February to Sunday, 27 February 2000 in Ghent, Belgium. This was the first ever edition to feature combined events and the first since 1975 to hold relay races.

Results

Men

Women

Medal table

Participating nations

 (2)
 (1)
 (10)
 (1)
 (3)
 (29)
 (2)
 (11)
 (2)
 (4)
 (13)
 (2)
 (3)
 (13)
 (50)
 (50)
 (28)
 (22)
 (20)
 (4)
 (7)
 (5)
 (36)
 (4)
 (5)
 (1)
 (1)
 (1)
 (1)
 (11)
 (5)
 (18)
 (9)
 (18)
 (53)
 (2)
 (6)
 (12)
 (22)
 (20)
 (8)
 (8)
 (21)
 (2)

See also
2000 in athletics (track and field)

References
 Athletix

 
European Athletics Indoor Championships
European Indoor
International athletics competitions hosted by Belgium
Sports competitions in Ghent
European Athletics Indoor Championships
European Athletics Indoor Championships
European Athletics Indoor Championships, 2000